Áine Ní Fhoghludha, (10 November 1880 – 1932) was an Irish nationalist and writer in the Irish language.

Life
Born in Ring in County Waterford to schoolteachers Micheál Ó Foghludha and Eibhlín de Brún. Her father was an advocate for the Irish language and she graduated in Irish. She taught in County Waterford but she lost her job after the Easter Rising. Some suppose that her nationalism was the reason as she was an active nationalist and she supported the IRA.

Her book Brosna published in 1922 was used in Irish schools.

She died in Caherciveen of pneumonia and was buried at Ring.

References

Bibliography

 Idir na fleadhanna (1922) 
 Brosna (1925)
 Díthreabhach an tobair (1934) 
 Breacadh an lae (1934)
 Bréag-riocht Apollo agus cúiteamh .i. Dhá dhráma i gcóir na ngasóg (1934)
 Róis dhearga agus buadhann Críost (1934)

External links
 https://nccb.tcd.ie/catalog/x633h592d
 http://recirc.nuigalway.ie/2016/08/curious-case-catherine-burke/

1880 births
1932 deaths
20th-century Irish people
Irish poets
People from County Waterford
Irish-language writers